Julio César Recoba Serena (born 3 April 1997) is a Uruguayan professional footballer who plays as a midfielder for Uruguayan Segunda División Amateur club Mar de Fondo.

Career
Recoba started his senior career with amateur side Basáñez. In January 2019, he was signed by Uruguayan Primera División club Fénix. He made his professional debut on 20 August 2020 in a 2–2 draw against Cerro.

In June 2022, he signed for Uruguayan Segunda División Amateur club Mar de Fondo.

Personal life
Julio is the son of former Uruguay international Álvaro Recoba.

References

External links
 

1997 births
Living people
Footballers from Montevideo
Association football midfielders
Uruguayan footballers
Uruguayan Primera División players
Centro Atlético Fénix players